Joseph Powell (1780–1834) was an English watercolour painter and printmaker. He was largely engaged as a teacher of painting in watercolours. He executed landscapes chiefly drawn from English scenery, and was a frequent exhibitor at the Royal Academy exhibitions from 1796 to 1829.

Life 
Joseph Powell was born in 1780. He painted at first in oils, but subsequently devoted himself almost entirely to watercolours. His subjects were landscapes, chiefly drawn from English scenery, but sometimes of a topographical nature. He was an unsuccessful candidate for the 'Old' Society of Painters in Water-colours at the time of its foundation. Powell was largely engaged as a teacher of painting in water-colours; Samuel Redgrave was among his numerous pupils. Powell was a frequent exhibitor at the Royal Academy exhibitions from 1796 to 1829. He showed also "considerable skill" as an etcher, says Lionel Cust, and published some etchings of trees for the use of his pupils, and some landscape etchings after the old masters. An etching of a landscape by Domenichino, now in the National Gallery, is executed with "much force", in Cust's opinion. He also published a few lithographs. There are watercolour drawings by him in the print-room at the British Museum, and at the Victoria and Albert Museum. He died in 1834.

Gallery

Notes

References

Sources 

 

Attribution:

Further reading 

 Bryan, Michael (1889). Bryan's Dictionary of Painters and Engravers. Rev. ed. Armstrong, Walter; Graves, Robert Edmund (eds.). Vol. 2. London: George Bell and Sons. p. 317.
 Graves, Algernon (1884). A Dictionary of Artists Who Have Exhibited Works in the Principal London Exhibitions of Oil Paintings From 1760 to 1880. London: George Bell and Sons. p. 188.
 Redgrave, Samuel (1874). "Powell, John, landscape painter". A Dictionary of Artists of the English School. London: Longmans, Green, and Co. p. 324.
 Catalogue of the First Circulating Collection of Water-colour Paintings of the British School, Illustrating the Rise and Progress of the Art: Selected from the Victoria and Albert Museum, South Kensington. H.M. Stationery Office, 1908. p. 30.
 "Joseph Powell". The British Museum. Retrieved 23 September 2022.
 "Powell, Joseph". Benezit Dictionary of Artists. Oxford Art Online. 2011. Retrieved 23 September 2022.

1780 births
1834 deaths
19th-century English painters
English watercolourists
English landscape painters